Hoseynabad-e Pain may refer to:
 Hoseynabad-e Pain, Anbarabad, Kerman Province
 Hoseynabad-e Pain, Rafsanjan, Kerman Province
 Hoseynabad-e Pain, South Khorasan

See also
 Hoseynabad-e Sofla (disambiguation)